Shahrdari Hamedan Football Club is an Iranian football club based in Hamedan, Iran who compete in League 2. Alvand Hamedan was born out of this club.

Season-by-season

The table below shows the achievements of the club in various competitions.

See also
 Hazfi Cup
 Iran Football's 2nd Division 2009–10

Football clubs in Iran
Association football clubs established in 2001
2001 establishments in Iran